Euel Walton Moore (May 27, 1908 – February 12, 1989) nicknamed "Chief" was a pitcher in Major League Baseball. He played for the Philadelphia Phillies and New York Giants.

In 1930, Moore pitched a no-hitter in the Texas League for the San Antonio Indians.

Moore was a Chickasaw. After his baseball career, he served in the U.S. Army in World War II and then for 27 years as a game ranger in Oklahoma.

Moore died on February 12, 1989, aged 80.

References

External links

1908 births
1989 deaths
United States Army personnel of World War II
Baseball players from Oklahoma
Chickasaw people
Major League Baseball pitchers
Native American baseball players
Native American United States military personnel
New York Giants (NL) players
Philadelphia Phillies players
20th-century Native Americans
Baltimore Orioles (IL) players
Dallas Steers players
Galveston Buccaneers players
Hazleton Mountaineers players
Muskogee Chiefs players
New Orleans Pelicans (baseball) players
San Antonio Indians players